Kista was a borough (stadsdelsområde) in Stockholm,  Sweden, until 1 January, 2007. It organised the districts of Akalla, Hansta, Husby and Kista. In 2007, Kista merged with the borough of Rinkeby to form the Rinkeby-Kista borough.

External links 
Kista - Official site
Kista Science City

Government of Stockholm